Australachalcus is a genus of flies in the family Dolichopodidae. It is very closely related to the genus Achalcus, in which some of its species were originally placed. The name Australachalcus ("southern Achalcus") refers to the southern hemisphere, where the genus reaches its highest levels of species richness.

Species

Australachalcus acornis Pollet, 2005
Australachalcus albipalpus (Parent, 1931)
Australachalcus brevinervis (Van Duzee, 1930)
Australachalcus browni Pollet, 2005
Australachalcus chaetifemoratus (Parent, 1933)
Australachalcus cummingi Pollet, 2005
Australachalcus edwardsae (Van Duzee, 1930)
Australachalcus incisicornis Pollet, 2005
Australachalcus japonicus Pollet & Stark, 2005
Australachalcus latipennis Pollet, 2005
Australachalcus longicornis (Van Duzee, 1930)
Australachalcus luteipes (Parent, 1933)
Australachalcus medius (Parent, 1933)
Australachalcus melanotrichus (Mik, 1878)
Australachalcus minor (Parent, 1933)
Australachalcus minusculus (Parent, 1933)
Australachalcus minutus (Parent, 1933)
Australachalcus nigroscutatus (Parent, 1933)
Australachalcus pseudorobustus Pollet, 2005
Australachalcus relictus (Parent, 1933)
Australachalcus robustus Pollet, 2005
Australachalcus separatus (Parent, 1933)
Australachalcus setosus Pollet, 2005
Australachalcus variabilis Pollet, 2005

References

Dolichopodidae genera
Achalcinae
Diptera of North America
Diptera of South America
Diptera of Europe
Diptera of Asia
Diptera of New Zealand